Pongsakon Seerot, or simply known as Kai, is a Thai professional footballer who plays as a midfielder for Thai League 2 club Chiangmai United.

References

External links
 Profile at Siamsport
 Profile at Goal
 

1994 births
Living people
Pongsakon Seerot
Pongsakon Seerot
Association football midfielders
Pongsakon Seerot
Pongsakon Seerot
Pongsakon Seerot
Pongsakon Seerot
Pongsakon Seerot
Pongsakon Seerot
Pongsakon Seerot
Pongsakon Seerot
Pongsakon Seerot